Joseph Alfred Warner was an Irish Anglican priest.

Warner was educated at Trinity College, Dublin and ordained in 1926.  After curacies at Willowfield, Mallow and Cork he held incumbencies at Kilmeen and Castlemartyr before five years as a Chaplain in the RAFVR. When peace returned he held further incumbencies at Midleton and Carrigtwohill. He was Dean of Cloyne from 1952 until 1957; and Archdeacon of Cloyne  from 1957  until 1965.

References

Alumni of Trinity College Dublin
Archdeacons of Cloyne
Royal Air Force Volunteer Reserve personnel of World War II
Irish military chaplains
Royal Air Force chaplains
World War II chaplains
20th-century Irish Anglican priests